Chorda filum, commonly known as dead man's rope or sea lace among other names, is a species of brown algae in the genus Chorda. It is widespread in the temperate waters of the northern hemisphere. The species has numerous other common names related to its physical appearance. These include mermaid's tresses, cat's gut or sea-catgut, bootlace weed, sea-twine, and mermaid's fishing line.

Description

The holdfast is disc-shaped. They are usually anchored to loose substrates like gravel and pebbles or other macroalgae and eelgrass. They are annuals and die during winter. The fronds bear short colorless hairs in summer.

Chorda filum is similar to Halosiphon tomentosus. However H. tomentosus is less common and is covered with long brown paraphyses or sterile hairs.

Habitat
Chorda filum is to be found in very sheltered shores. It may be common or abundant near low water and in the sublittoral to  areas in mud and sand.

Distribution
Chorda filum is found in temperate waters in the northern hemisphere, on the coasts of the northern Atlantic and Pacific oceans. Within this, it is noted as being widespread and generally common around Ireland, Great Britain, the Shetland Isles, and the Isle of Man.

References

External links
 

Laminariales
Species described in 1753
Taxa named by John Stackhouse